"You and Me and the Devil Makes 3" is a song by American rock band Marilyn Manson. It is the tenth track on the 2007 album Eat Me, Drink Me, and was released as a promotional single from the album in September 2007. The song features the most prominent bass on the album, and ends in a musical melee.

The lyrics "I'm just like rolling a stone up a hill in Hades" is a reference to Sisyphus, a figure who in Greek mythology was sentenced to roll a stone up a hill for eternity. The spoken phrase "Pants can always come off, pants can always come off" can be heard around 3:33 - half of the number 666.

References

External links
Official Marilyn Manson website
Official Eat Me, Drink Me website

Marilyn Manson (band) songs
2007 songs
Songs written by Marilyn Manson
2007 singles
Interscope Records singles
Songs written by Tim Sköld